Sandie Jones (1951 – 19 September 2019) was an Irish singer.

Eurovision
She represented Ireland in the Eurovision Song Contest 1972 with the song "Ceol an Ghrá". This was the only occasion in the history of the contest on which an Irish performer performed a song in the Irish language.

Death
Jones died after a long illness on 19 September 2019, at the age of 68. She was in hospice care in the United States, where she had moved later in her life.

Awards and nominations

|-
|1972 ||  "Ceol an Ghrá" || Single #1 in Irish Singles Chart|| 
|-

Discography

Singles

Royal Earls
"Reflections of You" (Release Records - RL.514 - July, 1969)
"Keep In Touch" / "Voice In The Crowd" (Release Records - RL.535 - June, 1970)
"I Don't Want To Play House]" (Release Records - RL.574 - 1971)
Dixies
"Ceol an Ghrá" / "Cry Cry Again" (Play Records - PLAY 20 - February, 1972) - #1 Irish Chart
"What Do I Do" / "It Was Only A Heart" (Sandie Jones & Joe O'Toole) (Play Records - PLAY 21 - March, 1972) - #1 Irish Chart
"Looking For Love" (Sandie Jones) / "Sandie" (Joe O'Toole) (Play Records - PLAY 31 - August, 1972)
"The Happiest Girl" / "I Don't Want To Play House" (Sandie Jones) (Play Records - PLAY 47- November, 1972)
Boyfriends
"End of the World" / "It's A Crying Shame" (Release Records - RL.704 - November, 1973)
"Bim Ban Boom" / "Single Girl" (EMI Records - EMI.5001 - July, 1974)
Sandie Jones Band
"Boogie Woogie Dancing Shoes" / "Instrumental" (Spider Records - WEB.006 - March, 1979) - #15 Irish Chart
"Shoes On Boots Off" / "Instrumental" (Spider Records - WEB.017 - December, 1979) - #17 Irish Chart
Sandie and the Jones Gang
"I Don't Want To Marry Superman" / "Take The Money and Run" (Spider Records - WEB.041 - 1981)

References

1951 births
2019 deaths
Eurovision Song Contest entrants of 1972
Eurovision Song Contest entrants for Ireland
Irish expatriates in the United States
Musicians from Cork (city)
20th-century Irish women singers